Margaret Court defeated Evonne Goolagong in the final, 6–4, 7–5 to win the women's singles tennis title at the 1973 Australian Open.

Virginia Wade was the defending champion, but was defeated by Kazuko Sawamatsu in the quarterfinals.

Seeds
The seeded players are listed below. Margaret Court is the champion; others show the round in which they were eliminated.

  Margaret Court (champion)
  Evonne Goolagong (finalist)
  Virginia Wade (quarterfinals)
  Kerry Melville (semifinals)
  Patricia Coleman (second round)
  Kazuko Sawamatsu (semifinals)
  Kerry Harris (quarterfinals)
  Karen Krantzcke (quarterfinals)
  Eugenia Birioukova (third round)
  Barbara Hawcroft (third round)
  Marilyn Tesch (third round)
  Janet Young (second round)

Draw

Key
 Q = Qualifier
 WC = Wild card
 LL = Lucky loser
 r = Retired

Finals

Earlier rounds

Section 1

Section 2

Section 3

Section 4

External links
 1973 Australian Open – Women's draws and results at the International Tennis Federation

Women's singles
Australian Open (tennis) by year – Women's singles
1972 in Australian women's sport
1973 in Australian women's sport
1973 WTA Tour